Duke Riley is an American artist. Riley earned a BFA in painting from the Rhode Island School of Design, and a MFA in Sculpture from the Pratt Institute.  He lives in Brooklyn, New York. He is noted for a body of work incorporating the seafarer's craft with nautical history, as well as the host of a series of illegal clambakes on the Brooklyn waterfront for the New York artistic community. Riley told the Village Voice that he has "always been interested in the space where water meets land in the urban landscape."

Work
One of Riley's projects entailed a bar constructed from found objects in the concrete pilings that supported the humming Belt Parkway.  Riley told a reporter for The New York Times that he charged for the drinks so that he was violating New York law by selling alcohol without a license as well as trespassing on federal property.

In 2007, Riley launched a replica of the Revolutionary War era Turtle, a small wooden submarine designed to enable American patriots to sink British Navy ships by attaching mines to the hulls.   He and two companions who had helped him construct the wooden submarine were arrested by the New York City police when they came within 200 feet of the Queen Mary 2, without authorization, at New York City's Red Hook Brooklyn cruise ship terminal. Jesse Bushnell, one of the men arrested with Riley, is a descendant of David Bushnell, the inventor of the Turtle.

In 2009 he constructed four ships for the purpose of staging a Naumachia, a Roman-style gladiatorial sea battle staged for an audience. Riley's Naumachia, entitled, Those About to Die Salute You, was staged at the Queens Museum of Art in a reflecting pool left over from the 1964 World's Fair that was filled with 70,000 gallons of water for the occasion. Since the weapons were baguette and tomatoes, and the audience as well as the warriors dressed in period costume, Artnet described the event as something between a Toga party and fraternity food fight. Riley constructed ships from four different historical periods, including a model of his nemesis, the Queen Mary 2. The ships were crewed by staff from four New York City Museums, the Queens Museum of Art, the Brooklyn Museum, the Bronx Museum of the Arts and El Museo del Barrio of Manhattan.  Although the ships sank rapidly, Riley told The New York Times that he considered the work of art a success since no one was killed, drowned, injured or arrested.

In 2016, Fly by Night, a performance in the Brooklyn night sky by 2,000 Riley-trained, LED light-carrying pigeons enjoyed tremendous critical and popular success; The New York Times called it "a revelation."

His 2017 exhibit, Now Those Days Are Gone, featured drawings and samplers depicting individual birds, mostly pigeons, as well as including a bicycle, army truck, and MASH supplies.

Solo exhibitions
2022 “DEATH TO THE LIVING, Long Live Trash”, Brooklyn Museum, Brooklyn, NY  
2017
"Now Those Days Are Gone", Magnan Metz Gallery, New York, NY
2013
"Trading With The Enemy", Magnan Metz Gallery, New York, NY
2012
"The Rematch", Zhujiajiao, Shanghai
2011
"Two Riparian Tales of Undoing", Magnan Metz Gallery, New York, NY
2010
"An Invitation of Lubberland", Cleveland Museum of Contemporary Art, Ohio
"Reclaiming the Lost Kingdom of Laird", as part of "Philagrafika 2010", Historical Society of Pennsylvania
"Second St. Patrick's Day Parade", Havana, Cuba
2009
"Those About to Die Salute You", Queens Museum of Art, NY
"First St. Patrick's Day Parade", Havana, Cuba 
2007
"After the Battle of Brooklyn: East River Incognita 2", Magnan Projects, New York, NY
2006
"Duke Riley Presents Paul Pierce for Chanel", "Six Feet Under Series", White Box, New York, NY
2005
"United Islands of the East River: East River Incognita", Sarah Lawrence College, NY
2001
"Duke Riley", Climate 8, New York, NY

Group exhibitions
2013
"Battle Ground", Proteus Gowanus, Brooklyn, NY
2012
"To The Stars On The Wings Of An Eel", Gowanus Ballroom, Brooklyn, NY
2011
"Sea Worthy", Elizabeth Foundation for the Arts, New York, NY
"Bienal do Mercosul", Port Alegre, Brazil
2010
"Announcing Magnan Metz Gallery", Magnan Metz Gallery,New York, NY
2009
"Bright Path", Little Berlin, Philadelphia, PA
"Seaworthy", Corridor Gallery, Brooklyn, NY
"Rent Control: NYC Documented and Imagined", The Maysles Institute, Harlem, NY
"Chelsea Visits Havana: Havana Biennial", Museo de Bellas Artes, Havana, Cuba
2008
"Maritime: Ships Pirates & Disasters", Contemporary Art Galleries, Storrs, CT
"Building Steam", Grossman Gallery, Lafayette College, Easton, PA
"Plastic Topography, South Street Seaport Museum", Melville Gallery, New York, NY
2007
"Grow Your Own", Palais de Tokyo, Paris, France
"Emergency Room", P.S. 1 Center for Contemporary Art, Queens, NY
"Mixed Signals", Ronald Feldman Fine Arts, New York, NY
2006
"Ultimate Destination" D.U.M.B.O. Arts Center Gallery, Brooklyn, NY
2005
"Building", British Consulate, Belfast, Northern Ireland
"A Knock At The Door", Lower Manhattan Cultural COuncil, New York, NY
"We Could Have Invited Everyone", Anrew Krepps Gallery, New York, NY
"Inaugural Opening", Magnan Projects, New York, NY
2004
"Benefit Show", Robert Miller Gallery, New York, NY
"T&A IV", GV/AS Gallery, Brooklyn, NY
"Book", Weir Space, Belfast, Northern Ireland
2002
"Invitational Group Show", National Arts Show", New York, NY
2001
"Night Swimming", State of Art Gallery, Brooklyn, NY
2000
"Of Earth and Sky", American Museum of National History, New York, NY
1999
"Three-Perwson Exhibition", C. Francis Gallery, Providence, RI
1996
"Invitational Group Show", Bernard Toale Gallery, Boston, MA

Awards, Grants, and Scholarships
2013
The Percent for Art Commission, PS 343 Manhattan, NY
2012
Creative Time Global Residency, Africa
Gasworks International Residency Programme, London
2011
Pollock-Krasner Foundation, New York, NY
smARTpower, U.S. State Department, Shanghai, China
Residency, The Wassaic Project, Wassaic, NY
Joan Mitchell Foundation Grant, Painters an Sculptors, New York, NY
2010
MTA Arts for Transit ArtCard, New York, NY
AICA Award, 2nd Place Best Project in a Public Space: "Duke Riley: Those About to Die Salute You"
2009
Art Matters Foundation, New York, NY
2008
MTA Arts for Transit Commission: Beach 98th Street Station Renovation, 2011 Completion
Chashama Residency, Fremantle Arts Center, Fremantle, Western Australia
2007
Residency, Fremantle Arts Center, Fremantle, Western Australia
2005
Graduate Academic Achievement Scholarship, Pratt Institute, Brooklyn, NY'
Circumnavigate, Independent Project Grant, Artists Space, New York, NY
2004
Lagenside Development Corporation Grant, Cathedral Arts Quarter, Annual Festival, Belfast, Northern Ireland
2003
Belfast Arts and Business Partners Foundation Grant, Northern Ireland

References

External links

Duke Riley's Art Card, commissioned by MTA Arts for Transit

American artists
Living people
Rhode Island School of Design alumni
Pratt Institute alumni
Year of birth missing (living people)